Qasim Amin (1 December 1863, in Alexandria – April 22, 1908 in Cairo) was an Egyptian jurist, Islamic Modernist and one of the founders of the Egyptian national movement and Cairo University. Qasim Amin has been historically viewed as one of the Arab world's "first feminists", although he joined the discourse on women's rights quite late in its development, and his "feminism" has been the subject of scholarly controversy. Amin was an Egyptian philosopher, reformer, judge, member of Egypt's aristocratic class, and central figure of the Nahda Movement. His advocacy of greater rights for women catalyzed debate over women's issues in the Arab world. He criticized veiling, seclusion, early marriage, and lack of education of Muslim women. More recent scholarship has argued that he internalized a colonialist discourse on women's issues in the Islamic world, regarded Egyptian women as objects serving to achieve national aspirations, and in practice advocated reforms that diminished the legal rights of women in marriage contracts.

Greatly influenced by the works of Darwin, Amin is quoted to have said that "if Egyptians did not modernize along European lines and if they were 'unable to compete successfully in the struggle for survival they would be eliminated." He was also influenced by the works of Herbert Spencer and John Stuart Mill who argued for equality of the sexes; Amin believed that heightening a woman's status in society would greatly improve the nation. His friendships with Muhammad Abduh and Saad Zaghloul also influenced this thinking. Amin blamed traditional Moslems for Egyptian women's oppression saying that the Quran did not teach this subjugation but rather supported women's rights. His beliefs were often supported by Quranic verses. Born in an aristocratic family, his father was a governor of Diyarbekir Elayet, and his mother the daughter of an Egyptian aristocrat. Amin finished law school at 17 and was one of thirty seven to receive a government scholarship to study at the University of Montepellier, in France. It was said that there he was influenced by Western lifestyles, especially its treatment of women. This would soon be his role model in his struggle to liberate the Egyptian women. His crusade began when he wrote a rebuttal, "Les Egyptiens. Response a M. Le duc d'Harcourt" in 1894 to Duke d'Harcourt's work (1893), which downgraded Egyptian culture and its women. Amin, not satisfied with his own rebuttal, wrote in 1899 Tahrir al mara'a (The Liberation of Women), in which he blamed Egyptian women's "veiling," their lack of education, and their "slavery," to Egyptian men as being the cause of Egypt's weakness. He believed that Egyptian women were the backbone of a strong nationalistic people and therefore their roles in society should drastically change to better the Egyptian nation. Amin is known throughout Egypt as a member of the intellectual society who drew connections between education and nationalism leading to the development of Cairo University and the National Movement during the early 1900s.

Early life

Born of a Kurdish father and a Egyptian mother, Amin lived a sheltered life among Egypt's political and wealthy elite. His father, Muhammad Amin Bey, served as governor of Diyarbekir Vilayet, before moving the family to Alexandria, Egypt where Amin was born. Qasim's father settled in Egypt and became the commander of Khedive Isma'il Pasha's army. Qasim's father held large feudal estates in Alexandria and Diyarbekir. Qasim's mother was the daughter of Ahmad Bey Khattab a son of Tahir Pasha (Egypt) a Nephew of Muhammad Ali Pasha's family. Qasim is recorded as a hereditary Bey both paternially and materinally in the 'Imperial and Asiatic quarterly review and oriental and colonial record'.

Education

As a youth, Amin was enrolled in many of Egypt's most privileged schools. He attended primary school in Alexandria, and then in 1875, attended Cairo's Preparatory School. The curriculum at the school was said to be strict and heavily Europeanized. By 1881, at the age of 17, he received his law degree from the Khedival School and was one of thirty seven to receive a government scholarship to continue his education at Frances' University de Montpellier. His mission in France lasted four years.
 University of Montpellier 1881-1885
 Khedivial Law School
 Cairo preparatory school
 Alexandria palace school

Marriage

In 1894, Amin married Zeyneb the daughter of Admiral Amin Tafiq, the joining him to an Egyptian aristocratic family. His wife was raised by a British nanny. Therefore, he felt it was necessary for his daughters to be raised by a British nanny as well. Amin's advocacy of resisting women's wearing of the niqab was said to have perpetuated within his own family. Although, he could not change his wife from her wearing of it, his plan was to teach the younger generation of females, like his daughter, to not wear it again.

Career

After his accomplishment in France, Amin became a part of the British empire's civil servant class. In 1885, he was appointed a jurist in the Mixed Courts. This court was said to be "saturated" in foreign western influence. The Mixed Courts created in 1875, was a mixture based on Napoleonic judicial system and Islamic Law. The jurists were foreigners from England, Austria, Germany, and France. Amin held a successful tenure with these foreign based legal officers. The goal of the Mixed Courts was to control the commercial life of Egypt during its chaotic control by foreign governments and people. The court's governmental tribunal often competed with the religious courts in its decision making. It was noted for its true reflection of the "right way" because it based its judgments on valid and sound reasoning. By 1887, he entered a predominately western- run Egyptian office of the Government Division of Legal Affairs. Within four years, he was selected one of the National courts' Egyptian judges.

Cairo University
Qasim Amin's was one of the founders of the first Egyptian University, known then as the National University, it formed the nucleus of the present Cairo University, he was a member of its constituent committee. Qasim Amin insisted that Egypt needed a Western style university.

Posts

 Chancellor of the Cairo National Court of Appeals
 Secretary general of Cairo University
 Vice President of Cairo University

Qasim was appointed the first secretary general of Cairo University

Charis Waddy an Islamic scholar and writer, and the first woman graduate of Oriental Languages at Oxford University states that Qasim was 'a brilliant young lawyer'.

The Nahda (Awakening) influence

A central figure of the Nahda Movement that was said to have trickled down to Egypt during the latter part of the 19th century and into the early part of the 20th century during a period of "feminist consciousness', Amin was greatly influenced by several pioneers of the movement particularly the exiled Muhammad Abduh whom he had become a translator for, while in France. Abduh blamed Islamic traditionalists for the moral and intellectual decay of the Islamic world which he believed caused the colonization of the Islamic society by western forces. Egypt at the time was a colony of the British Empire and partly of France. Islamic traditionalist, Abduh believed, had left the true Islamic faith and had followed cultural habits rather than the religion which would have given them greater intellect, power, and justice. Furthermore, he criticized the patriarchal domination of women within the family maintained in the name of sharia law. Abduh advocated for all Muslims to unite, return to the true message sent by Allah which gave women equal status, and resist Western Imperialism that had occupied the Moslem World. Greatly impacted by the influence of Mohammad Abduh and though a trained student of the colonial powers, Amin accepted Abduh's philosophies which he generated into his own. He too believed that traditional Moslems had created an inferior society by not following true Islamic laws, that advocated the right of females in society, but instead followed cultural values to keep Egyptian women in submission. To him, this created an inferior society of men and women compared to the young men and women of the Western World. Amin spent a great portion of his life advocating the change of women's role in Egyptian society through his belief that a freer and more educated Egyptian woman would improve society for the better.

Attitude on Veiling 

Qasim Amin in his book The Liberation of Women (1899) argued for the abolition of the veil. He thought that changing customs regarding women and changing their costume, abolishing the veil in particular, were key to bringing about the desired general social transformation. Qasim Amin's book inaugurated the battle that lead to a new discourse in which the veil came to comprehend significations far broader than merely the position of women. He pointed out the connotations of veil also had to do with issues on class and culture: the widening cultural gulf between the culture of the colonizers and that of the colonized. In this discourse, the issues of women and culture first appeared as inevitably fused in Arabic discourse. Amin argued that the veiling and segregation constituted "a huge barrier between woman and her elevation, and consequently a barrier between the nation and its advance".

However, many Muslim scholars like Leila Ahmed criticized Qasim Amin's motivation of liberating women from veils for not being the result of reasoned reflection and analysis but the internalization and replication of the colonialist perception. Amin's argument against seclusion and veiling was simply that girls would forget all they had learned if they were made to veil and observe seclusion after they were educated. The age at which girls started to be veiled and secluded, twelve to fourteen, was a crucial age for the development of talents and intellect, and veiling and seclusion frustrated that development; girls needed to mix freely with men, for learning came from such mixing. This position clearly contradicts with his earlier idea that no education for women should go beyond primary-school level.

To answer conservatives who worried about abolition of the veil would have influence on women's purity, Amin replied not from the perspective of gender equality, but from the standpoint to follow the superior Western civilization. He wrote, "Do Egyptians imagine that the men of Europe, who have attained such completeness of intellect and feeling that they were able to discover the force of steam and electricity...these souls that daily risk their lives in the pursuit of knowledge and honor above the pleasure of life, ... these intellects and these souls that we so admire, could possibly fail to know the means of safeguarding woman and preserving her purity? Do they think that such a people would have abandoned veiling after it had been in use among them if they had seen any good in it?"

Words on Marriage and Divorce 
Qasim Amin believed that the marriage among Muslims was not based on love but on ignorance and sexuality, just like the missionary discourse. In his text, the blame has shifted from men to women. Women were the chief source of the "lewdness" and coarse sensuality and materialism characterizing Muslim marriages. Qasim Amin accused Egyptian wives' souls for being not superior enough to experience true love. Egyptian wives could know only whether their husbands were "tall or short, white and black." Their husbands' intellectual and moral qualities, sensitive feelings, knowledge, whatever other men might praise and respect for, were beyond the wives' grasp. To Qasim Amin, the duty of women in marriage is mainly about doing housework and taking care of children. Therefore, a primary-school education would be enough for women to do their duties.

Although seeing women as inferior to men, Qasim Amin did support the legislation of divorce. Although according to the tradition, the divorce will become true after repeating the words three times, Qasim Amin thought such oral agreement was not serious enough. The lack of legal system in the divorce process was what Qasim Amin thought that contributed to the high divorce rate in Cairo. He therefore proposed that in legal situations Muslims should depend on formal statements primarily as declarations of intent. Qasim Amin believed the formal statements could force the husband to be aware of his clear desire of separating with his wife. Qasim Amin criticized the Muslim scholars for being narrowly interested in the word "divorce". Muslim scholars, in the mind of Qasim Amin, focused their works on the variations of expressions of divorce, such as "I have divorced you" or "you are divorced." Qasim Amin pointed out these efforts were only useful in the study of grammar and language, not in the development of discipline in jurisprudence. Qasim Amin thought the benefit of having a legal system on divorce would prevent men from accidentally divorcing from their wives because of jokes and quarrels,

Works
Amin was heavily influenced by the works of Darwin, Herbert Spencer and John Stuart Mill, and was friends with Mohammad Abduh and Sa'd Zaghlul.
he was an early advocate of women's rights in Egyptian society. His 1899 book The Liberation of Women (Tahrir al mara'a) and its 1900 sequel The New Woman (al mara'a al jadida) examined the question of why Egypt had fallen under European power, despite centuries of Egyptian learning and civilisation, and concluded that the explanation was the low social and educational standing of Egyptian women.

Amin pointed out the plight of aristocratic Egyptian women who could be kept as a "prisoner in her own house and worse off than a slave". He made this criticism from a basis of Islamic scholarship and said that women should develop intellectually in order to be competent to bring up the nation's children. This would happen only if they were freed from the seclusion (purdah) which was forced upon them by "the man's decision to imprison his wife" and given the chance to become educated.

Some contemporary feminist scholars, notably Leila Ahmed, have challenged his status as the supposed "father of Egyptian feminism". Ahmed points out that in the gender-segregated society of the time, Amin could have had very little contact with Egyptian women other than immediate family, servants, and possibly prostitutes. His portrait of Egyptian women as backward, ignorant, and lagging behind their European "sisters" was therefore based on very limited evidence. Ahmed also concludes that through his rigorous critique and generalizations of women in Egypt along with his zealous praise of European society and colonialism, Amin, in effect, promoted the substitution of Egyptian androcentrism with Western androcentrism, not feminism.

Books by Qasim Amin

1894: "" was written as a response to Duke Hartcourt's staunch criticism of Egyptian life and women. Amin did not defend the Egyptian women in his rebuttal but did defend Islam's treatment of women.
1899: Tahrir al- mar'a (The Liberation of Women)- Unsatisfied with his rebuttal, Amin called for the education of women only to primary level. He maintained his belief in patriarchal domination over women yet advocated modifying legislation affecting divorce, polygamy and abolition of the veil . The book was co-written with Muhammad Abduh and Ahmad Lufti al-Sayid. The book used many Quranic verses to support his belief.
1900: al-Mar'a al-jadida (The New woman) in his book, Amin envisioned 'the new woman' emerging in Egypt whose conduct and actions were modeled from the Western woman. This book was considered more liberal in nature, but used social Darwinist as his argument. In his book he states "A woman may be given in marriage to a man she does not know who forbids her the right to leave him and forces her to this or that and then throws her out as he wishes: this is slavery indeed."

Other works

"Huquq al-nisa fi'l-islam"("Women's rights in Islam")
"Kalimat ("Words")
"Ashbab wa nata if wa-akhlaq wa-mawa. Iz ("Causes, effects, morals, and recommendations").
"Al-a'mal al-kamila li-Qasim Amin: Dirasa wa-tahqiq" ("The Full Works of Qasim Amin: Study and Investigation")
 Al-Misriyyun ("Egyptians")'
"The Slavery of Women"
"They young Woman, 1892"
"Paradise"
"Mirror of the Beautiful"
"Liberation of Women"

Intellectual contribution

An advocate for social reform in his native country of Egypt, during the latter part of the 19th century when it was a colony under the British Empire, Amin called for the establishment of nuclear families similar to those in France, where he saw women not placed under the same patriarchy culture that subjugated Egyptian women. Amin believed that Egyptian women were denied their Quranic rights to handle their own business affairs and marry and divorce freely. He refuted polygamy saying it "implied an intense contempt of women," and that marriage should be a mutual agreement. He opposed the Egyptian custom of "veiling" the woman, saying it was the major pronunciation of woman's oppression. The niqab, Amin said, made it impossible to identify women. To him, when they walked with their niqab and long dresses, it made them more noticeable to men and more distrusted. Furthermore, he exclaimed that men in the West treated women with more dignity allowing them to go to school, walk without a veil, and speak their mind. This freedom, he insisted "contributed significantly" to the foundation of knowledge in the nation. He supported the idea that educated women brought forward educated children. When women were enslaved in the home, without a voice and without an education, they tended to spend their time wastefully and bring forth children that would grow to be lazy, ignorant, and mistrustful. Once educated, these women could become better mothers and wives by learning to manage their homes better. Amin gave an example of the situation. He said "Our present situation resembles that of a very wealthy man who locks up his gold in a chest. This man," he said "unlocks his chest daily for the mere pleasure of see his chest. If he knew better, he could invest his gold and double his wealth in a short time." Therefore, it was important to the Egyptian nation that women's roles should be changed. Although, he maintained his view that Egypt remain a patriarchal society, its women should remove the veil and be given a primary education. This he believed was a stepping stone to a stronger Egyptian nation that which was free of English colonialism.

Controversy

Critics of Amin's philosophies are quick to point out that Amin had no association with women other than aristocratic women or prostitutes and they therefore question his stance of condemning all Egyptian women. Furthermore, Leila Ahmed, a novelist and reformer, suggests in her book Women and Gender in Islam that Amin's attempt to discredit the veil as a reason for Egyptian weakness is clearly a Western view. She illustrates how Westerners tend to use the veil as a reason to colonize Islamic nations by correlating the veil with inferiority. In addition, Ahmed points out that Amin's Egyptian woman, would not have control over her own body but instead it would be used to build up the nation. To her, this is hypocrisy because the Egyptian woman would still be the slave of her husband, her family, and her nation. In addition, history professor, Mona Russell further challenges Amin's description of the new woman saying that it was "one of the fruits of modern society." She argues that she is not "new", does not care to be "synonymous" with the Western woman, and is her own being. Amin, they believe, was influenced by his foreign education and upper middle class position which looked to foreign colonialism as superior rule. It was his way of integrating into foreign colonialism that held power of Egypt. His quote in which he says "We today enjoy a justice and a freedom the like of which I do not think Egypt has ever witnessed at anytime in the past"  is proof of this admiration. They therefore feel that his opinions were based on bias rather than truth.

Quotes
 "I do not advocate the equality between men and women in education for this is not necessary"
 "Our laziness has caused us to be hostile to every unfamiliar idea."
 "The number of children killed by ignorant women every year exceeds the number of people who die in the most brutal wars."
 "A good mother is more useful to her species than a good man, while a corrupt mother is more harmful than a corrupt man."
 "It is impossible to be successful men if they do not have mothers capable of raising them to be successful."
 "There is no doubt that the man's decision to imprison his wife contradicts the freedom which is the woman's natural right."
 "The woman who is forbidden to educate herself save in the duties of the servant, or is limited in her educational pursuits is indeed a slave, because her natural instincts and God-given talents are subordinated in deference to her condition, which is tantamount to moral enslavement."

See also
 Mustafa Sabri
 Islamic feminism
 Women and Islam
 List of women's rights activists
 Hoda Shaarawi
 Nawal el-Saadawi
 Leila Ahmed

References

Further reading
 Ahmed, Leila. (1992). Women and Gender in Islam.
 Drewes, G. W. J. (1958). "Qasim Amin, Egyptisch feminist (1865-1908)." Bijdragen tot de taal-, land-en volkenkunde/Journal of the Humanities and Social Sciences of Southeast Asia 114.1: 55-71. online
 McLarney, Ellen. (2018). "Reviving Qasim Amin, Redeeming Women’s Liberation." in Arabic Thought against the Authoritarian Age: Towards an Intellectual History of the Present, 262+ online.
 Mazid, Nergis. (2012). "Western Mimicry or Cultural Hybridity: Deconstructing Qasim Amin's 'Colonized Voice'." American Journal of Islam and Society 19.4: 42-67.
 Moradi, Fateme, and Nasrin Shokrpour. (2020). "Freedom and Education of Women in the Works and Ideas of Qasim Amin Mesri and Parvin Etesami." International Journal of Multicultural and Multireligious Understanding 7.5: 176-188 online.

19th-century Egyptian writers
20th-century Egyptian writers
1863 births
1908 deaths
Egyptian feminists
19th-century Egyptian judges
Egyptian magazine founders
Egyptian Muslims
Egyptian people of Turkish descent
Egyptian women's rights activists
Male feminists
Proponents of Islamic feminism